Paajanen is a Finnish surname. Notable people with the surname include:

 Severi Paajanen (born 1986), Finnish footballer
 Paavo Paajanen (born 1988), Finnish racing cyclist
 Otto Paajanen (born 1992), Finnish ice hockey player

Finnish-language surnames